Bruce Vanderveer, professionally known as Automatic, is a Grammy-nominated American record producer, songwriter, and entrepreneur. He is currently signed to Sony/ATV Music Publishing and is the CEO/co-founder of the entertainment company InRage Entertainment.

On his first production job, Automatic worked directly with Michael Jackson. Automatic has worked with artists such as Pink, Pussycat Dolls, Nicole Scherzinger, Christina Aguilera, Cher, Fabolous, James Brown and Raven Simone. In 2009, Automatic produced the #2 song on the Billboard Hot Singles Sales Chart, Cradle to the Grave, recorded by American Idol's Bettina Bush. His latest K-Pop record, "Rock The World", was recorded by K-Pop sensation JYJ's Kim Junsu (Xia).  Featuring The Quiett and Automatic himself, the record was released on May 30, 2016 as the lead single from Xia's fourth studio album, Xignature, which peaked at number 14 on Billboard's World Albums chart. The Grammy-nominated producer also co-wrote the song "I'm Gonna Be a Star" alongside Ebony Rae Vanderveer, Park Jinyoung and Olltii. The South Korean girl group Twice recorded the song which served as the theme song for the 2015 reality girl group survival show Sixteen. Automatic also produced Xia's 2012 hit single "Uncommitted" which peaked at number 1 on South Korea's Gaon albums chart and number 19 on Billboard's Korea K-Pop Hot 100 chart.

Early life 

Automatic was born in Bushwick, Brooklyn, New York; raised in Flatbush and Red Hook, Brooklyn to a 16-year-old mother and raised by one of the most infamous drug dealers of New York City. He never met his biological father. Of Black-American and Japanese descent, Automatic was taught in the traditions of Buddhism from a young age. While many of his peers were involved in illegal activities, Automatic's attraction to music kept him from the dangers of the rough city streets of his neighborhood. His first encounter with a guitar lent to his name, Automatic. There was a little boy who lived next door to Automatic that played the guitar every day. Automatic asked the little boy to play guitar every day, but the little boy would not share. One day, after being so frustrated that his neighbor would not share, he shoved the little boy down and took his guitar from him. The little boy ran upstairs to tell his mother and Automatic started plucking the old, 4-stringed guitar. He intuitively began to play a melody on the guitar. Having no prior instrumental or musical lessons, his mother was stunned that her son was playing a tune on the spot. Thus, she nicknamed him, "Automatic".

From that day on, Automatic showed he had a natural ability to learn how to play instruments. In junior high, he joined the concert band at Roy H. Mann Junior High School in Brooklyn. He chose to play the trombone. Each week he would ask his classmates if he could borrow their instruments to take home so that he could learn how to play them. He eventually taught himself how to play 13 instruments. Automatic also used his nickname as his stage name when he would rap and dance. Growing up in hip-hop, he was part of the early, crucial moments in hip-hop that would later define and popularize the genre. Automatic befriended and battled with who would become hip-hop icons Notorious B.I.G., LL Cool J, Nice and Smooth and Big Daddy Kane. Automatic's popularity as a hip-hop artist grew. When he was 13 years old, he was invited to participate in a PBS special on hip-hop where he break danced. His appearance in the special led to him appearing as a dancer in Krush Groove, starring Run DMC, LL Cool J and Sheila E. He also danced in Beat Street.

In addition to music and dancing, Automatic focused on martial arts with his sensei who taught him Yip Man's Wing Chun kung-fu. He began practicing Bruce Lee's style of Jeet Kune Do. He competed in and won multiple underground fights as a teenager and became well-respected in the martial arts community.

Crisis leads to record deal 

When he was 15 years old, Automatic left home to escape the abuse and negative lifestyle of his step-father. As a result of leaving home, he became homeless, living on the streets of Brooklyn for four months. He was on track to be the valedictorian of South Shore High School and was the most popular kid in high school, but all of this turmoil in his life caused him to drop out of school. He worked at the Palladium, Mels Diner and a microfilm company for money until he could afford his own apartment. He convinced a landlord in Sunset Park, Brooklyn to rent an apartment to him at the age of 16.
Automatic formed a band, Auto and Cherokee. The band played CBGB's, the Cat Club, the Palladium and other clubs in the Village and Manhattan. The band soon caught the eye of J.J. French, bass player of the rock band, Twisted Sister. French signed on to manage the group. The band moved together to Red Hook, Brooklyn and shared a factory-style loft. They auditioned for multiple record companies and were turned down many times. Grammy Award-winning producer, David Kershenbaum, heard about the group and came to Red Hook to hear the band who performed a showcase in their loft for him. He immediately signed them to Morgan Creek/Polygram Records. In 1993, the first professional release was Auto and Cherokee, "Naked Music", written, composed and produced by Automatic, Keith Cohen and Carmen Rizzo. The album was a fusion of hip-hop, R&B and Prince-infused vibes. The album featured Dave Coz and members of the group Fishbone. The single from the album "Taste" is featured in the movie The Crush starring Alicia Silverstone and in "Stay Tuned" starring John Ritter. While on Morgan Creek, Automatic was managed by Rob Kehane and Mark Schimmel.

From producing and songwriting in the 1990s 

In 1994–1995, Automatic began to develop musical groups under his production company Apple Children Productions. The first group that he put together was Forever Yours, later named Brownstone. He also discovered a young Australian boy on Venice Beach, Wade Robson, whom he taught hip hop and rap and developed vocally. He later became a member of the duo Quo. Both acts later became signed to Michael Jackson's record label, MJJ Records/Sony. Wade Robson went on to become a world-famous choreographer working with acts like ‘Nsync and Britney Spears. In 1994, he became the youngest producer to sign a double production deal with to A&M/Perspective records. He worked directly with legendary producers Jimmy Jam and Terry Lewis. They produced acts including four songs on Raja-Neé’s album Hot and Ready. He produced "How Long" by Sweet Sable for the Above the Rim soundtrack and produced a remix of James Brown's "How Long."

From 1995 to 1998, he worked for the WB Television Network producing songs for The Jamie Foxx Show, Sister Sister and Cleghorne!. He wrote and produced the American Airlines theme song.
In 1999, he was signed to Sony Music as a writer/producer by Erica Greyson and Jim Vellutato. He began working with A-list writers with Sony and worked with artists like Pink, India Irie, Christina Aguilera, Pussycat Dolls, Raven Simone, Nicole Scherzinger, Kurupt and Fabolous. In addition to producing, he worked on the mixing side of production with Dave Pensado and Manny Marroquin.

In 2009, Automatic produced "Cradle to the Grave" and "She Is" for Bettina Bush which reached #2 and #4 on the Billboard Hot Single Sales Chart, respectively.

In Summer 2012, Automatic produced the hit single, "Uncommitted" for K-Pop sensation, Kim Junsu (Xia) of superstar pop group JYJ. The video for "Uncommitted" debuted at #1 in Korea and China. It has reached #1 on China's YinYueTai Chart, #1 on Peruvian Radio Charts, and #1 on Korea's Hanteo chart.[1] At Kim Junsu's recent concert in LA, Korean news site TV Daily reported: "the song produced together with Sony music producer AUTOMATIC, Uncommitted, is a chic urban pop song that attracted great attention."[2] Furthermore, the popular Canadian YouTube duo EatYourKimchi, well known for introducing K-Pop to foreigners, also reviewed Uncommitted: "From start to finish, the song is consistently solid and we’re totally digging it."[3] Also Kim Junsu described his recording experience with Automatic in his August 2012 Cyworld Music Interview: I also felt that I had a lot of freedom while recording my worldwide album. Because the composer respects the artist and the artist's feeling 120%, the recording was so pleasant. This time I choked and coughed a bit when I was singing, but the composer Automatic treated me so nicely, by telling me that I could rest as much as I want to or have a cup of warm tea and try again, that I didn't know what to do. It was pleasant to work with them."[4]

Automatic also performs as lead vocalist in the group Asphalt Messiah.

InRage Entertainment 
With his experience as a music producer, Automatic was exposed to a range of multiple music genres that included rock, country, pop, and R&B. The constant pressure from the industry wanting him to focus on one genre, sparked Automatic’s interest to develop his own label. Automatic partnered with corporate attorney, Roger Doumanian founder of Fresh Element, to create an entertainment company focused on music diversity. In 2016, InRage Entertainment was re-born, when Automatic partnered with his wife, Ebony Rae Vanderveer, to expand the model of the entertainment company. The label is currently based in Los Angeles, California and functions as a record label, artist development company and music, film and television production company.

Production and engineering

Film and television credits

Branding

Companies

Singer/Musician

References

External links
 Automatic interview with Asia Pacific Arts

Record producers from New York (state)
Living people
People from Bushwick, Brooklyn
Singers from New York (state)
Songwriters from New York (state)
People from Flatbush, Brooklyn
People from Red Hook, Brooklyn
Year of birth missing (living people)